Mark Dennehy (born October 18, 1967) is an American ice hockey head coach who most recently led the former Binghamton Devils of the American Hockey League.

Career
Dennehy debuted for the Boston College Eagles in the fall of 1987, playing four years with the team that included three first place finishes, three NCAA tournament appearances and a Frozen Four appearance in 1990. After graduating, he played for the Ayr Raiders of the now-defunct British Hockey League in their final season of existence, finishing third in scoring for his team. Dennehy earned a tryout with the IHL's Fort Wayne Komets the following season but retired from playing soon thereafter.

After nearly a year away from hockey, Dennehy returned to his home state and was brought on by his former BC assistant coach Joe Mallen to help out with team practices for Massachusetts. Dennehy then became a full time coach, joining the staff at Princeton under Don Cahoon. After five years with the Tigers, which saw the program's first ever NCAA tournament appearance in 1998, Dennehy became the head coach for Fairfield. Dennehy took over the program after it posted one of the worst records in NCAA history the year prior of 1–31. His first season was only slightly better with only three wins in the 1999–00 season. After the poor season, Dennehy resigned and rejoined Cahoon as an assistant, this time with the Massachusetts Minutemen. He remained as an assistant for an additional five seasons before starting his second stint as a head coach with Merrimack.

Prior to Dennehy arriving at Merrimack, the Warriors had not had a winning season since they had joined Hockey East in 1989. His first two seasons saw little success, including a school-worst three-win campaign in his second year, but the college stuck with him and allowed Dennehy to slowly build the program. By year five, the Warriors had risen to 16-wins, their best record since 1994. Dennehy was honored as the 2010 Bob Kullen Coach of the Year, the first Merrimack coach to receive the award. The following season, the team posted 25 wins and recorded their first winning season in over 20 years. The team reached the Hockey East tournament final and made only their second NCAA tournament appearance. After another winning season in 2010–11, Merrimack returned to sub-.500 records. Dennehy was fired by Merrimack following the 2017–18 season.

He was hired as the head coach of the Wheeling Nailers in the ECHL on May 29, 2018. However, prior to coaching a game for the Nailers, he took the head coaching position with the American Hockey League's Binghamton Devils. In August, 2021, he was promoted by the Devils to become their Chief Scout of Amateur Scouting, which remains his current position with the organization. Under his leadership, in July, 2022, New Jersey selected Slovakian defenseman Simon Nemec with the 2nd overall pick in the NHL amateur draft in Montreal.

Head coaching record

College

References

External links

Living people
1967 births
People from Boston
Ice hockey coaches from Massachusetts
American ice hockey coaches
Fairfield Stags men's ice hockey coaches
Merrimack Warriors men's ice hockey coaches
Boston College Eagles men's ice hockey players
Ice hockey players from Massachusetts